Clark College is a community college in Vancouver, Washington, United States.

Clark College may also refer to:
Clark Atlanta University, in Atlanta, Georgia, United States, which was formed in 1988 by the merger of Clark College and Atlanta University
Clark State Community College, in Springfield, Ohio, United States
Clark University, in Worcester, Massachusetts, United States